Whiting Griswold (November 12, 1814 – October 28, 1874) was an American abolitionist, lawyer and politician who served as a member of the Massachusetts House of Representatives and in the Massachusetts Senate. In 1864 Griswold was a presidential elector from Massachusetts for Abraham Lincoln.

Career
In 1842 Griswold was admitted to the Massachusetts Bar at Northampton, Massachusetts.

See also
 1869 Massachusetts legislature

Notes

External links
 The Library of Congress Whiting Griswold correspondence, 1843-1874
 Whiting Griswold Papers, 1837-1890. University of Massachusetts Amherst Libraries
 Whiting Griswold Correspondence A Finding Aid to the Collection in the Library of Congress
  Griswold Family Papers, 1836-1888. Chapin Library, Williams College

1814 births
People from Greenfield, Massachusetts
Members of the Massachusetts House of Representatives
Massachusetts state senators
Massachusetts lawyers
American abolitionists
Massachusetts Democrats
Massachusetts Free Soilers
Amherst College alumni
1874 deaths
People from Buckland, Massachusetts
Massachusetts Republicans
People from Northampton, Massachusetts
19th-century American lawyers